The Lois M. DeBerry Special Needs Facility is a maximum-security prison in Nashville, Tennessee, operated by the Tennessee Department of Correction.

Opened in 1992, the facility houses prisoners with multiple and complex medical problems.  The facility has a 250 bed-per-month turnover.

The Cumberland River flows along the facility's west boundary, and the Riverbend Maximum Security Institution is located immediately south of the facility.

Services
The Lois M. DeBerry Special Needs Facility is equipped with three nursing units, as well as a secure community hospital to provide inpatient and outpatient care.  Inmates include those requiring mental health intervention, those recovering from serious illness or surgery, inmates with long-term medical needs, and inmates whose treatment regimen is not manageable at other Tennessee Department of Corrections facilities.

Visitation
The Reconciliation Guest House provides overnight lodging and kitchen facilities to families and friends who travel to Nashville to visit inmates at the Lois M. DeBerry Special Needs Facility.

Notable inmates

James Earl Ray spent the last few years of his life at this hospital. He died in April 1998.

References

Prisons in Tennessee
Buildings and structures in Nashville, Tennessee
1992 establishments in Tennessee